State Street Historic District is a national historic district located at Rochester in Monroe County, New York. The district consists of the last surviving continuous row of 19th-century masonry commercial buildings within Rochester's Inner Loop.  They were developed between 1825 and 1900 and the row forms an unpretentious unbroken wall of 12 buildings.  The oldest building is located at 141-147 State Street and was constructed about 1825.

It was listed on the National Register of Historic Places in 1984.

References

External links

Historic districts in Rochester, New York
Federal architecture in New York (state)
Historic districts on the National Register of Historic Places in New York (state)
National Register of Historic Places in Rochester, New York